Sofronio may refer to:
Sofronio Española, a 2nd class municipality in Palawan, Philippines
Sofronio Palahang (born 1967), Filipino tennis player
Sofronio Roxas (1938–1984), Filipino farmer and dissident against the Marcos dictatorship